Wellington AFL is an Australian rules football competition in Wellington, New Zealand consisting of 4 men's and 2 women's clubs and is one of the Leagues governed by AFL New Zealand. It was founded in 1974. The current Wellington women's league was founded in 2021.

Current clubs

Former clubs
 Lower Hutt Tigers (merged with the Upper Hutt Eagles to form the Hutt Valley Eagles)
 Upper Hutt Eagle (merged with the Lower Hutt Tigers to form the Hutt Valley Eagles)

Results

Men's

Women's

Historic League
The Wellington League of Australian Football ran from 1904 until the end of 1909. The league was formed in May 1904 at a meeting in Wellington, with the secretary being J.T. Kelly and had two founding clubs: Lefroy and Federal and played its first match at Seatoun Park. The league expanded to five clubs in its first season. Despite substantial growth it finally folded due to ongoing access issues with the Football Association to its primary venue the Basin Reserve due to a lack of alternative venues.

Clubs

References

Australian rules football competitions in New Zealand
Sport in Wellington